Abdullah Afeef (1916 – July 13, 1993) was the President of the United Suvadive Republic from 1959 to 1963. Born in Hithadhoo, Addu Atoll, Afeef was an educated and well-respected individual from a family of notables.
Owing to his knowledge of the English language, he served as a translator to the British military at Gan airbase in the same atoll. His local name was Elha Didige Ali Didige Afeefu.

Abdullah Afeef was the breakaway nation's first and only president.
The Suvadive  government was unceremoniously dismantled by the British and the Maldive Islands' government representatives in 1963. Following this, Abdullah Afeef was exiled to the Seychelles where he died about 40 years later.
Southern islanders still remember him fondly as "our Afeefu".

Insurrection of the Addu Islanders
During the 1950s, the government of the Maldive Islands (now Maldives) sought to implement certain centralizing measures. As a result, there was discontent in the Southern Atolls.

In Addu Atoll there were riots against the central Maldive government in the year 1958.
Among those who were involved in the uprising against the militiamen of the central government posted in Addu was Abdullah Afeefu.

In Addu Atoll there was a British air base in the island of Gan. The new prime minister of the Maldive Islands had appointed Abdullah Afeef as the liaison officer between the British and the locals.
Shortly afterwards, in December 1958, the government announced plans for a new tax on boats. This caused riots throughout the atoll again, leading to several attacks on Maldive government buildings.
Once again, the officials of the Government of the Maldive Islands were forced to retreat to the safety of the British barracks. This time Abdullah Afeef saved the lives of the Maldive officials by warning them of the impending unrest.

Afeef chosen as President of the Suvadive Islands
Four days later, on 3 January 1959 a delegation of the Addu people arrived on Gan and declared their independence to the British. The delegation also demanded that Adullah Afeef be their leader.
Afeef was chosen to lead the nascent Suvadive government because of British insistence that a trustworthy leader whom they were familiar with be chosen, as a precondition for them being able to back the secession.

It is said that Afeef initially refused, and that he accepted the role of becoming the executive head of the new state only under heavy pressure.
The fledgling Suvadive state was soon joined by the other two Southern Atolls, Huvadu and Fua Mulaku.
In his first year as President, Afeef pleaded for support and recognition from Britain in the 25 May 1959 edition of The Times of London

However, Afeefu's pleas went unheeded and the British Government never recognized the "United Suvadive Islands".
Instead the initial British measure of lukewarm support for the small breakaway nation was withdrawn in 1961, when the British signed a treaty with the Maldive Islands without involving Afeef.
Following that treaty the Suvadives had to endure an economic embargo and attacks from gunboats sent by the Maldive government.
Without the support of the British, the Suvadive republic was on the brink of collapse.

Exile
Finally, in October 1963 the United Suvadive Republic was unceremoniously dismantled and the flag was hoisted over the main Suvadive government building in Hithadoo Island. Abdullah Afeef went into exile to the Seychelles with his immediate family aboard the British warship HMS Loch Lomond.

The blame of the Suvadive "Rebellion" (Baghaavaiy) as it is still known in Maldives, was put squarely on Afeefu's shoulders and on the British. There was not much persecution by the Malé government afterwards and the Suvadive nation was slowly forgotten. Afeef was officially declared a traitor to the Maldives, and a puppet of the British.

Still, most Southern Maldivians have a lot of respect for Afeef and claim that he was a gentleman, a man of integrity who did what he had to do in the circumstances. Despite having studied in Cairo, Egypt, Afeef had a secular and progressive outlook. Owing to his secularism and his admiration for the British, he was abjectly ridiculed and mocked as a "Kafir" or infidel by the press in Malé. But Afeef was an honest and kind person and was not like the typical corrupt, devious and self-righteous present-day politician. 

After 1963 Abdullah Afeef lived in Victoria, Mahe Island, in the Seychelles with his wife and children. From the Seychelles Afeef made repeated requests to the Maldive government to visit his home island Hitadhoo, to see his family, but the Maldivian authorities persistently ignored his requests. The Government in Malé didn't want to allow Abdullah Afeef to set foot in the Maldives again. Shortly before his death on 13 July 1993, when he was old and in a precarious health condition, Afeef was permitted to travel to Addu to see his relatives. However, an official pardon was not granted.

Perfidious Albion?
The controversy around the Suvadive still endures and touches sensitive fibers of many Maldivians. The general blame for the secession is put on the scheming British and their fork-tonguedness. This is not only convenient, but it also has a ring of truth, for it would be not the first time that the British have played the role of villain behind the scenes.

On one hand the British gave hopes to the trusting Suvadive islanders, legitimately afflicted by centralism and neglect. But on the other hand the same British later betrayed the Suvadive people by making a separate agreement with the government of the Maldive Islands behind the back of the islanders who trusted them fully.

The inhabitants of the neighboring atoll group, the Chagossian Islanders or Ilois were ditched similarly by the British Government when the USA agreed to pay handsomely to lease the island of Diego Garcia as long as there would be no bothering natives close by.

Genealogy
President Afeef Didi was the son of Ali Didi son of Hithadhoo Elha Didi (Mohamed Didi) son of Kalhihaaru Dhon Ali Thakurufan of Meedhoo son of Dhondhiyege Faathumaifaan daughter of Elhagedharige Hussein Thakurufaan son of Kudhuraniage Ibrahim Thakurufan son of Kudhuraniage Faathumafaan daughter of Ibrahim Naib Thakurufaan son of Vazeeul Kabeer Mohamed Bodufuiy Thakurufaan son of Chief Justice Hussein Quthubuddeen son of Chief Justice Mohamed Shamsuddeen (also known as Addu Bodu Fandiyaaru Thakurufan).

Afeef Didi's mother is Fathima Didi daughter of Aishath Didi daughter of (Gan'duvaru) Dhon Didi daughter of Aminath Didi daughter of Maradhoo Mudhingey Mariyam Manikufaan and An-Nabeel Moosa Didi (Kilegefaanuge Moosa Didi) son of Al-Ameer Abdulla (Ibrahim Faamuladheyri Kilegefaan) who is the only surviving son of Sultan Mohamed Ghiyasuddin son of Sultan Ibrahim Iskandar II son of Sultan Mohamed Imaduddin Al-Muzaffar (Imaduddin II) of Dhiyamigili Dynasty.

References

Hijrī Sādavana Satta ah Balailumeh. Council of Historical and Linguistic Research. Novelty. Malé 1986

1916 births
1993 deaths
Maldivian Muslims
United Suvadive Republic
Heads of state of former countries
Heads of state of states with limited recognition
Maldivian emigrants to Seychelles
People from Addu City